Bob Forward (born 1958) is an American writer, producer, and director. Forward is the production director and president of his independent company, Detonation Films. Forward has been the writer of many animated television series, as well as a film, The Owl, based on his novel of the same name, which has just been republished.

Forward is the son of the Robert L. Forward, who was an American physicist and science fiction writer. His sister is Eve Forward. Forward currently resides in Chatsworth, Los Angeles, California, while Detonation Films is located in Simi Valley, California. Forward is also known to have registered at least one patent under his name.

Filmography

Writer 
 series head writer denoted in bold

Director

Producer

Novels
Forward (writing as Robert D. Forward) is the author of two novels, The Owl (1984) and its sequel The Owl 2 (1990).

References 

American film directors
American film producers
American male screenwriters
Living people
Place of birth missing (living people)
1958 births